Ronald Eugene Andersen  (May 26, 1941 – July 3, 1997) was an American bridge player. He won 11 "national"-rated events at North American Bridge Championships, thrice-annual 10-day meets organized by the American Contract Bridge League, where he became known best as a superior live commentator in the vugraph room.

Andersen was born in Cedar Falls, Iowa, and studied at the University of Iowa before beginning a professional bridge career. Eventually he owned a seat on the Chicago Board Options Exchange and he died in a Chicago hospital at age 56.

Andersen finally became a favorite commentator for European Bridge League and World Bridge Federation championships, as well as major ACBL tournaments. In the month before his death, June 1997, he worked the European Championships in Italy, from which he was flown home to Chicago after suffering two strokes in consequence of kidney failure.

Andersen co-wrote seven books related to the Precision Club bidding system with C. C. Wei, inventor of the system, or Kathie Wei.

Andersen and Sabine Zenkel traveled the world as a partnership during 1991–1992, based in Chicago. They also wrote a book, Preempts from A to Z (1993; 2nd, 1996).

Publications

with C. C. Wei
 Newly revised and expanded in 1978. 

  Reprinted in 1992 by Devyn Press, Louisville KY. 

with Sabine Zenkel
 Second edition published in 1996.

Bridge accomplishments

Awards

 Mott-Smith Trophy (1) 1974
 ACBL annual masterpoints leader (4): McKenney Trophy 1977, 1980, 1983; Barry Crane Trophy, 1986

Wins

 North American Bridge Championships (11)
 von Zedtwitz Life Master Pairs (1) 1982 
 Blue Ribbon Pairs (1) 1978 
 Nail Life Master Open Pairs (1) 1970 
 Jacoby Open Swiss Teams (1) 1989 
 Marcus Cup (1) 1965
 Mitchell Board-a-Match Teams (1) 1974 
 Chicago Mixed Board-a-Match (1) 1971 
 Reisinger (1) 1980 
 Spingold (3) 1983, 1986, 1988

Runners-up

 North American Bridge Championships
 Rockwell Mixed Pairs (1) 1993 
 Silodor Open Pairs (1) 1974 
 Wernher Open Pairs (1) 1983 
 Blue Ribbon Pairs (1) 1975 
 Vanderbilt (4) 1974, 1977, 1979, 1980 
 Mitchell Board-a-Match Teams (1) 1984 
 Reisinger (2) 1986, 1992 
 Spingold (1) 1990

References

External links

 
  

1941 births
1997 deaths
American contract bridge players
Contract bridge writers
People from Cedar Falls, Iowa